Spark is the third album from Norwegian singer-songwriter Marit Larsen, and was released on 18 November 2011. The information was made available via Marit Larsen's Tumblr page. On 31 July 2011 Marit Larsen began to post information about her third album on her Tumblr. On 7 October 2011 she announced the name of the album and track list. The first single, "Coming Home" had premiered on NRK P3 and on her Facebook page on 15 October. The album produced two singles; "Coming Home" and "Don't Move". The album spawned 2 number one songs in the Philippine Top 100 Songs Chart where in "Coming Home" stayed atop for 4 consecutive weeks, which gave Marit her first number one song in the Philippines as a solo artist and her non-single song "Last Night" stayed for 2 consecutive weeks in the early 2012, serving as her second number one song.

Track listing

Chart

Singles

Technical credits
Marit Larsen – Vocals, arranger, Piano, Mandolin, Acoustic Guitar, Electric Guitar, Glockenspiel, Zither, Harmonica, Celeste, Hand Claps, Church Organ.
Kåre Christoffer Vestrheim – Producer, arranger, Piano, Harpsichord, Celeste, Cowbell, Hand Claps, Accordion, Electric Guitar.
Geir Sundstøl – Acoustic Guitar, Lap Steel Guitar, Mandolin, Harmonica, Harp.
Tor Egil Kreken – Bass, Electric Guitar, Acoustic Guitar 
Torstein Lofthus – Drums
Michael Scott Hartung – Recording engineers, Acoustic Guitar, Mixed.
Tommy Kristiansen – Acoustic Guitar 
Hans Andreas Horntveth Jansen – Assistant recording engineers
Kristoffer Bonsaksen – Assistant recording engineers
Artwork – Erland G. Banggren
Photography – Jørgen Gomnæs

Certifications

Trivia
In her Tumblr page, Marit Larsen talked about a track entitled "Blue Print", but it didn't make the final track list.

External links
Marit Larsen – Official Tumblr

References

2011 albums
Marit Larsen albums